The Type 119 Zerstörer 1 class was a class of 6 destroyers by the West German Navy. They entered service in 1958, with the last one being decommissioned in 1982.

History 
Since the time for planning, building and testing its own larger ships was not available, the Federal Republic of Germany received six destroyers of the Fletcher class for the German Navy from the USA from 1958 to 1960 as part of the Mutual Defense Assistant Act. An option for the surrender of five more destroyers was not taken. After the loan period was extended, the four units that were still available at that time were purchased in 1976 for the equivalent of an estimated €191,500 each.

They were not given any names when they were commissioned; they were only numbered from 1 to 6. It was not until 1960 that they were given the names Zerstörer 1 to Zerstörer 6. In common parlance, the destroyers continued to be called Z-1, Z-2, Z-3, Z-4, Z-5 and Z-6.

After their commissioning, the first three destroyers were assigned to the 1st Destroyer Squadron, and the other three to the 3rd Destroyer Squadron. The homeport for all units was Kiel. The Zerstörer 3 was subordinated to the Fleet Service Squadron in Flensburg from April 1, 1974. From October 1, 1971, the remaining destroyers were combined in the 3rd Destroyer Squadron. After the dissolution of the 3rd Destroyer Squadron on June 30, 1981, the two remaining destroyers, Zerstörer 2 and Zerstörer 5, were placed under the 1st Destroyer Squadron until they were decommissioned.

After their decommissioning, Zerstörer 1 and Zerstörer 6 were cannibalized as spare parts reserves for the other destroyers. Zerstörer 6 was canceled and Zerstörer 1 was then used up as a target ship for naval aviation in the Mediterranean.

The other destroyers were handed over to the Greek Navy as part of defense aid.

The tasks of the destroyers of the Zerstörer 1 class were taken over by the frigates of the Bremen class.

Characteristics 

Before the takeover, the ships were modernized to a considerable extent. All 20 mm Oerlikon cannons were removed and the 40 mm Bofors guns were replaced by three 76.2 mm twin flak. In order to gain the deck space required for these guns and the fire control equipment connected to them, the third 127 mm gun and the front quintuplet torpedo tube set had to be removed. The electronics were modernized and the mast was replaced by a tripod mast.

When the six destroyers were later in dock, the initially open bridges of the six destroyers were converted into an enclosed bridge while at the same time being enlarged. Three destroyers (Zerstörer 2, Zerstörer 3 and Zerstörer 4) were each provided with a small hut on the back of the bridge. Furthermore, all six ships were retrofitted with two U-defense torpedo tubes (single 533 mm). Later the second quintuplet torpedo tube set was also removed.

From the beginning of the 1960s to 1962, Zerstörer 4 had two 40 mm Bofors flak MELs in the positions of the 76.2 mm flak on the port and starboard side. For testing purposes, a containerized 76 mm OTO Melara gun was carried from 1974 to spring 1975 instead of the eighth 76.2 mm anti-aircraft twin.

Ships in the class

Gallery

Citations 

Fletcher-class destroyers of the German Navy
Destroyer classes